Mátraháza is a village in the suburbs of Gyöngyös in Heves County, in northern Hungary. It is a summer and winter resort in the Mátra, which is a mountain range in Heves county. It best found by travelling on the road 24, which crosses the commune. It is 2 km from Kékestető, which is the highest mountain in Hungary, at 1014 metres.

Specified Information 
Population: 290
Postal code: 3233

History 
The first building in the village was a hospice house. It was built in 1930, Mátra Association. They were the denominators of the village.

Sights of the village 
Pagoda Hotel
Church
Park

See also
 List of highest paved roads in Europe
 List of highest paved roads in Europe by country

External links 
 Mátraháza
 Mátraháza

Populated places in Heves County